Fushë-Arrëz is a municipality and town in Shkodër County, northwestern Albania. The municipality consists of the administrative units of Blerim, Fierzë, Iballë, Qafë-Mali with Fushë-Arrëz constituting its seat. As of the Institute of Statistics estimate from the 2011 census, there were 2,513 people residing in Fushë-Arrëz and 7,405 in Fushë-Arrëz Municipality. The area of the municipality is 540.42 km2.

References

External links 

bashkiafushearrez.gov.al – Official Website 

Fushë-Arrëz
Administrative units of Fushë-Arrëz
Municipalities in Shkodër County
Towns in Albania